Granat was a Soviet space observatory. Granat may also refer to
Granat (surname)
Cape Granat in Antarctica
Granat Encyclopedic Dictionary, a Russian encyclopedic dictionary
ZKS Granat Skarżysko, a Polish football club